Lionhead may refer to

 Lionhead (goldfish), a variety of goldfish
 Lionhead cichlid (Steatocranus casuarius), a fish
 Lionhead rabbit, a breed of domestic rabbit
 Lionhead Studios, a computer game development company
 Lionhead Unit, a campground at Priest Lake in Northern Idaho
 The head of a lion

See also
 Lion's Head (disambiguation)